Phoenix Union Station is a former train station at 401 South 4th Avenue in downtown Phoenix, Arizona, United States. From 1971 to 1996 it was an Amtrak station. Until 1971, it was a railroad stop for the Santa Fe and Southern Pacific Railroads. Union Station was served by Amtrak's Los Angeles–New Orleans Sunset Limited and Los Angeles–Chicago Texas Eagle. The station is on the National Register of Historic Places.

Architecture 

Phoenix Union Station was constructed in 1923 by the Santa Fe and the Arizona Eastern (Southern Pacific) Railroads. The Station is one of the best examples of Mission Revival architecture, along with Brophy College Preparatory, in Phoenix. The Mission Revival style, a popular building style between 1890 and the 1920s, was typified by such Union Station features as stucco wall finishes, arcades, red tiled roofs, curvilinear gables, massive piers, and impost moldings.

According to the "Phoenix Historic Building Survey" by the Phoenix City Council, September 1979:

 Historic Name Union Station of the Southern Pacific and Santa Fe Railroads
 Description
 A large Mission Revival railroad station with a central two-story waiting room structure between long, low arcaded wings. Red-tiled, gabled roofs are terminated by high parapet walls that are shaped with the familiar curves of the Mission Revival at the ends of the wings and in entrance pavilions at both the railroad and street sides of the central pavilion. In keeping with the character of the Mission Revival there are few other decorative details.

 The waiting room is a high, beamed space with original wooden furnishings and particularly fine ceiling light fixtures. There have been some alterations in the waiting room, and the arcaded wings which were originally open as passenger waiting areas have been enclosed. A microwave transmitting tower next to the central pavilion is out of harmony with the structure ...

 Significance
 Union Station was a joint venture between the Southern Pacific and Santa Fe Railroad Companies and was designed by their architect, Peter Kiewit. Dedicated on September 30, 1923, the building was proclaimed a "Monument to the progressiveness and prosperity of the valley and a testimony of the confidence in the future of the Salt River Valley and Phoenix."
 A milestone in Phoenix's development, Union Station ushered in tourism on a grand scale and promoted greater national visibility.

History 

Rob Bohannan presented this history at ARPA's dedication of the clock and plaque donated by ARPA members, January 11, 1992. Used with permission:

In 1995, the last full year Amtrak stopped at Union Station, 21,495 passengers boarded or alighted here.

Since Amtrak left in 1996, the Olympic Torch train has stopped here twice, and tourist trains like the GrandLuxe (formerly American Orient Express) have also occasionally used Union Station.

In 2000, the Arizona Department of Transportation and the Arizona Rail Passenger Association presented "Transpo 2000," an exposition of a modern Talgo trainset at Union Station.

Historic designations 
 National Register of Historic Places #NPS 85003056
 Phoenix City Register

Current services 

No regular passenger trains call at Union Station. However, as recently as 2010, there were efforts to bring back passenger rail service to Phoenix.

A private company, White's Taxi Shuttle, operates a taxi service to the Phoenix metro area;  there is Amtrak Thruway Motorcoach service to and from Maricopa with stops in Tempe and Phoenix (including Sky Harbor airport).

Amtrak's Southwest Chief train route operates through Flagstaff daily, and Amtrak provides guaranteed through-ticketed Thruway Motorcoach connecting shuttle service via Airport Shuttle of Phoenix or Arizona Shuttle from Metrocenter Mall (in north central Phoenix) and the town of Camp Verde (in Yavapai County) to and from the trains at Flagstaff.

The nearest Valley Metro Rail station, City Hall ("Washington Street and Central Avenue and Jefferson Street and 1st Avenue"), is half a mile away.

New passenger rail service connecting Phoenix and Tucson to Los Angeles is heavily supported as of 2021 by the American Jobs Plan. By 2035, Amtrak has proposed to have rail service connecting 16 stations in Arizona.

Notes

References 
 The Union Station: Phoenix' Portal to the Nation; City of Phoenix Historical Preservation Commission, Don W. Ryden AIA Architects Inc. January 1990
 A Historic Building Analysis of Phoenix Union Station; Ryden Architects, ca. 1984. 725.31028 H629, Phoenix Central Library, Arizona Collection. Includes photographs of the rarely seen second floor offices, former baggage/express areas, and attic spaces.
 Phoenix Historical Building Survey, Phoenix City Council, September 1979; 917.9174 C38p, Phoenix Central Library, Arizona Collection.
 Railroads of Arizona, vol. II—Phoenix and the Central Roads by David F. Myrick, Howell-North Books, San Diego, California, 1980. 385.09791 (Library of Congress: HE2771.A6M94;  (v.I))

External links 
 
 Arizona Rail Passenger Association's Photos of Union Station
 Aerial Photos of Southwest US Railroads
 Flickr Photo
 Amtrak Phoenix 
 Amtrak Phoenix to Tucson Expansion Plans - official Amtrak Connects US 15-year expansion plans for Arizona

Transportation buildings and structures in Phoenix, Arizona
Phoenix, Arizona
Atchison, Topeka and Santa Fe Railway stations in Arizona
Former Amtrak stations in Arizona
Former Southern Pacific Railroad stations
Union Pacific Railroad stations
History of Phoenix, Arizona
Railway stations in the United States opened in 1923
National Register of Historic Places in Phoenix, Arizona
Railway stations on the National Register of Historic Places in Arizona
Railway stations closed in 1996
1923 establishments in Arizona
1996 disestablishments in Arizona
Mission Revival architecture in Arizona
Rail transportation in Phoenix, Arizona